Frank Dennhardt (born 6 December 1967) is a former professional tennis player from Germany.

Career
Dennhardt competed in the men's singles main draw at the 1989 French Open, as a qualifier. He lost in the opening round to Yugoslav player Goran Prpić in straight sets.

Dennhardt won the Bangalore Challenger tournament in 1991.

Challenger titles

Singles: (1)

References

External links
 
 

1967 births
Living people
West German male tennis players
German male tennis players
Sportspeople from Darmstadt
Tennis people from Hesse